Gastrochilus calceolaris is a species in the family Orchidaceae. It is widespread across much of Southeast Asia, including southern China (Hainan, Tibet, Yunnan), Bhutan, Assam, Malaysia, Myanmar, Nepal, Thailand, Vietnam, Java, Sumatra, the Philippines, and the Andaman & Nicobar Islands.

Within the Philippines, in  it is found in only one location, in Benguet. So it is considered endangered within the country.

Its natural habitat is subtropical or tropical moist lowland forests. It is threatened by habitat loss.

See also
List of threatened species of the Philippines

References

External links

IOSPE orchid photos
Univers orchidées, Gastrochilus calceolaris - (Buch.-Ham.) D.Don (1825)
Großräschener Orchids,  Gastrochilus calceolaris
Orchids Online

calceolaris
Orchids of Asia
Orchids of China
Orchids of India
Orchids of Indonesia
Orchids of Malaysia
Orchids of Thailand
Flora of Luzon
Plants described in 1818
Taxonomy articles created by Polbot